Argentine Korean or Korean Argentine may be:
Of or relating to Argentina–North Korea relations
Of or relating to Argentina–South Korea relations
Argentines in North Korea
Argentines in South Korea
Koreans in Argentina
Eurasian (mixed ancestry) people of Argentine and Korean ancestry